The Last Lear is a 2007 Indian drama film directed by Rituparno Ghosh. The film won the National Award of India for Best Feature Film in English in 2007. The film stars Amitabh Bachchan, Preity Zinta, Arjun Rampal, Divya Dutta, Shefali Shah and Jisshu Sengupta. Shefali Shah won the Best Supporting Actress National Award for her role in the movie. It was produced by Arindam Chaudhuri of Planman Motion Pictures.

Production
Basing the script on Utpal Dutt's semiautobiographical play Aajker Shahjahan, Rituparno Ghosh penned it in 2006, and turned to the actors in February 2007, all of whom accepted the offer. The film began shooting from 28 February 2007 to 10 April 2007; principal shooting took place in Kolkata and some shooting took place in Mussoorie, Uttarakhand. Dubbing for the film ended on 31 August 2007.

The Last Lear premiered at the 2007 Toronto International Film Festival on 9 September and received a significant reception, earning many accolades after being showcased at a Gala Presentation.

The film was later showcased at the London Film Festival, and the International Film Festival of India in Goa. The film was received positively by critics with many saying that Bachchan has given a career best performance.

Plot
The story revolves around Harish Mishra (Amitabh Bachchan), a retired Shakespearean theatre actor who spent precisely thirty years and nine months on stage and then suddenly quit, and his first and last act as a cinema artist. He is immensely passionate about Shakespeare, believes that nothing even comparable can ever be written, knows all his plays by heart, lives in those stories, condemns modern cinema and considers theatre as a much higher artform for directors and actors to convey their message to an audience.

It is Diwali, a time when box offices are flooded with new releases and Shabnam (Preity Zinta) has to attend the premiere of her latest movie: The Mask. However, she decides to visit her co-star Harish and heads to a cubbyhole of old Kolkata where Harish is bedridden in a coma. He is being taken care by Vandana (Shefali Shah) and a nurse, Ivy (Divya Dutta). Vandana treats Shabnam with spite as she blames her and the entire cast and crew for Harish's condition. But soon they are seen bonding over tea and are involved in a conversation about Harish. In flashbacks, their story and equation with Harish emerges.

The movie sees parallel narration from Goutam (Jisshu Sengupta), a journalist who recalls his encounters with the veteran actor. He had suggested Harish for the lead role to his elder brother Siddharth (Arjun Rampal) who happens to be an ambitious perfectionist director. After a casual meeting with Harish, Siddharth realizes that to convince Harish to act in his film, he has to win his trust and establish a relationship with him. And, hence, the impatient young auteur attempts to win the trust and collaboration of the aged performer, who sits raging against the modern world from the sanctuary of his study.

Harish finally agrees to act in the film. Shooting happens on the stunning Himalayan foothills of Mussoorie. On the sets he befriends Shabnam and teaches her lessons on acting, life and Shakespeare. As the story unfolds one gets to know his relationship with Vandana, the reason behind his quitting theatre and last but not the least the reason for his illness. The Last Lear becomes a captivating reflection on the comparative artifices of stagecraft and cinema.

Cast
Amitabh Bachchan as Harish Mishra
Preity Zinta as Shabnam
Arjun Rampal as Siddharth Kumar
Divya Dutta as Ivy
Shefali Shah as Vandana
Jisshu Sengupta as Goutam Kumar 
Prosenjit Chatterjee as Cameo appearance

Reception
Nirpal Dhaliwal of The Guardian called it "The most god-awful film I have ever seen", criticizing its use of rather hammy English language than Hindi and mentioning that the main actor, Amitabh Bachchan, is a combination of Steve McQueen, James Stewart and Sean Connery all rolled into one but in this film he is closer to Bruce Forsyth and Derek Jacobi.

Janet Gruttsman of Reuters mentioned that the film doesn't have any song and dance routines which are usual highlights in Bollywood cinema. IndiaGlitz praised the film's cinematography and acting but criticized its screenplay, especially the ending. Sukanya Verma of Rediff.com gave it 3 out of 5 stars saying that "[The problem with The Last Lear] is that while Ghosh builds Harry's aura to perfection, everyone around him fails to reach out."

Awards
2009: Star Screen Award for Best Film in English
2009: National Film Award for Best Feature Film in English
2009: National Film Award for Best Supporting Actress - Shefali Shah

References

External links

International Film Festival of India - The Last Lear entry
Toronto International Film Festival - The Last Lear entry

English-language Indian films
Films featuring a Best Supporting Actress National Film Award-winning performance
Films set in Uttarakhand
Films shot in Mussoorie
Indian films based on plays
Films directed by Rituparno Ghosh
Best English Feature Film National Film Award winners
2000s English-language films